2629 Rudra, provisional designation , is a sizable Mars-crossing asteroid and slow rotator inside the asteroid belt, approximately  in diameter. It was discovered on 13 September 1980, by American astronomer Charles Kowal at the Palomar Observatory in California. The dark B-type asteroid has a long rotation period 123 hours and likely an elongated shape. It was named after Rudra from Hindu mythology.

Orbit and classification 

Rudra is a Mars-crossing asteroid, a dynamically unstable group between the main belt and the near-Earth populations, crossing the orbit of Mars at 1.66 AU. It orbits the Sun at a distance of 1.3–2.1 AU once every 2 years and 4 months (839 days; semi-major axis of 1.74 AU). Its orbit has an eccentricity of 0.23 and an inclination of 23° with respect to the ecliptic. The body's observation arc begins with its first observation in January 1954, more than 26 years prior to its official discovery observation. The precovery was taken at Palomar Observatory and published by the Digitized Sky Survey.

Naming 

This minor planet was named after Rudra from Hindu mythology. Rudra is the destroyer aspect of Shiva, and both destroyer and regenerator of all things in the Universe. The asteroid's name was suggested by Frederick Pilcher and published by the Minor Planet Center on 1 June 1996.

Physical characteristics 

In the SMASS classification, Rudra is an uncommon, carbonaceous B-type asteroid.

Rotation period 

In September 2010, a rotational lightcurve of Rudra was obtained from photometric observations by astronomers at the Palomar Transient Factory in California. Lightcurve analysis gave a rotation period of  hours with a brightness variation of 0.58 magnitude. Observations by the Wide-field Infrared Survey Explorer (WISE) found a higher brightness amplitude of 0.87 and 0.95, respectively, which indicates that the body has a non-spherical, elongated shape.

Diameter and albedo 

According to the surveys carried out by the NEOWISE mission of NASA's WISE telescope and the Japanese Akari satellite, Rudra measures between 4.73 and 6.69 kilometers in diameter and its surface has an albedo between 0.064 and 0.07, with a recently published diameter of  kilometers and an albedo of 0.064.

The Collaborative Asteroid Lightcurve Link assumes a standard albedo for a stony asteroid of 0.20 and consequently calculates a smaller diameter of 2.19 kilometers based on an absolute magnitude of 15.67.

Notes

References

External links 
 Asteroid Lightcurve Database (LCDB), query form (info )
 Dictionary of Minor Planet Names, Google books
 Discovery Circumstances: Numbered Minor Planets (1)-(5000) – Minor Planet Center
 
 

002629
Discoveries by Charles T. Kowal
Named minor planets
002629
002629
19800913